Tedje en de Flikkers (English translation: Ted and the Faggots)
was one of the earliest Dutch punk bands, founded in Nijmegen in
1977.  Their music is typically classified as
punk pathetique ('pret-punk', or 'fun-punk').  The band consisted of
Tedje van Asseldonk (a woman) and three gay men: Marti van Kerkhof, Thijs
Maasen, and Andréas Cuppen (André).

Like many punk bands, Tedje en de Flikkers were associated with leftist
political movements. They were actively involved with the Rooie Flikkers
(Red Faggots), a gay liberation group that thrived in Nijmegen
from 1975 to 1980, and that
emphasized actions through theater and music.

The goal of performances by Tedje en de Flikkers was to shock the
audience with their explosive and exhibitionistic performances. Band
members wore elaborate face-paint and leather suits, and used
dildos and sado-masochistic equipment as props.  Their
song lyrics were explicit about gay men's sex, and included insults
aimed at politicians.  Dutch pop magazines called them "the craziest
punk band in the Netherlands”. Some town mayors banned their 
performances.

Their best known songs are "Van Agt" and "Ik ben een hoer".  The lyrics of
"Ik ben een hoer" (English translation: "I am a whore") address sexual liberation, a common theme of queercore music; this will remind audiences, for example, of the song "I'm gonna be a slut" from American queercore band Pansy Division. "Van Agt" references the politician
 Dries van Agt, also the subject of the first Dutch punk single "Van Agt Casanova," released by Paul Tornado in 1977.  Tedje en de Flikkers' song "Op de Baan" addresses the topic of gay cruising in a park.   Tedje en de Flikkers played in concert venues including the Paradiso, de Melkweg, de Effenaar, Doornroosje, and the Cafe Royal in Zoutelande.

DISCOGRAPHY 
 self-titled LP Tedje & de Flikkers - Spina Bifida en Starlet, 1979
 contributions to the compilation album Uitholling Overdwars - Stichting Popmuziek Nederland, 1979
 contributions to the compilation album I Don't Care Collection (Dutch Punk 1977-1983) - Pseudonym, 2016

Videos
 VPRO-programma "R.A.M - TEDJE EN DE FLIKKERS" (2003).
 "Gluren in het donker" a documentary about the Rooie Flikkerbeweging made by Els Dinnissen (2005).

References 

Dutch punk rock groups
Musical groups from Nijmegen
Musical groups established in 1977
LGBT-themed musical groups
Queercore groups